The fantasy defense is where a defendant accused of attempting a crime (enticing minors into sexual activity, for example) claims that they never intended to complete the crime. Instead, they claim they were engaged in a fantasy and, in the case of luring a minor, believed they were dealing with an adult.

The fantasy defense was developed by Donald B. Marks, the attorney for Patrick Naughton, a Disney executive who eventually pleaded guilty to traveling in interstate commerce with the intent to have sex with a minor, in violation of 18 U.S.C. § 2423(b).
The "fantasy defense" used in the Naughton case was novel; however, since the closely watched Naughton fantasy defense was successful, defense lawyers were expected to use it to help other clients.

References 

Sex and the law
Pedophile advocacy
Criminal defenses
Sexual fantasies